St Thomas the Apostle was a parish church in St Thomas Apostle Street in the City of London. In existence by the late twelfth century, it was destroyed in the Great Fire of London in 1666 and not rebuilt.

History
The patronage of the church belonged to the canons of  St Paul's and it is mentioned in the register of the Dean and Chapter as early as 1181. John Stow implies that was rebuilt some time in the late fourteenth century, describing John Barnes, Lord Mayor in 1371 as "a great builder of S. Thomas Apostles parish church as appeareth by his armes there both in stone and glasse".

The parish was staunchly Royalist   in the years leading up to the Civil War In 1642, the rector, named Cooper, was sequestered and imprisoned in Leeds Castle owing to his loyalty to the king.

St Thomas' was destroyed by the Great fire in 1666.  Following the fire, a Rebuilding Act was passed and a committee set up under  Sir Christopher Wren to decide which buildings would be rebuilt. Fifty-one were chosen, but St Thomas the Apostle was not among  those chosen. Instead, the parish was united with that of St Mary Aldermary. Part of the site was used for the creation of Queen Street, though a small portion of the churchyard survived.

The site of the church is marked by a plaque in Great St Thomas Apostle Street near Mansion House tube station.

Edmund Allen, Bishop of Rochester, is said to have been buried in the church.

References

External links

12th-century church buildings in England
1666 disestablishments in England
Churches destroyed in the Great Fire of London and not rebuilt
Churches in the City of London
Former buildings and structures in the City of London